Thelymitra × truncata, commonly called the truncate sun orchid, is a species of orchid that is endemic to south-eastern Australia. It has a single tapering, more or less flat leaf with a reddish base and up to six blue, pink or white flowers with a tube-shaped lobe on top of the anther. It is a natural hybrid between a range of species, including T. pauciflora and T. ixioides.

Description
There are one or two bracts along the flowering stem. The lobe on top of the anther is tube-shaped with a dark collar and a yellow tip. The side lobes have mop-like tufts of white hairs on their ends. Flowering occurs from October to December. The plants are variable, due to crossing between a range of species to produce this hybrid.

Taxonomy and naming
Thelymitra × truncata was first formally described in 1917 by Richard Sanders Rogers from a specimen collected near Myponga and the description was published in Transactions and Proceedings of the Royal Society of South Australia. The specific epithet (x truncata) is a Latin word meaning "to maim or shorten by cutting off", referring to the shaped of the middle lobe on top of the column.

Distribution and habitat
The truncate sun orchid is widespread but uncommon, growing in heath, woodland and open forest. It occurs in southern New South Wales, most of Victoria, south-eastern South Australia and in Tasmania.

References

External links
 

truncata
Endemic orchids of Australia
Orchids of Victoria (Australia)
Orchids of New South Wales
Orchids of South Australia
Orchids of Tasmania
Plants described in 1917
Interspecific orchid hybrids